The flag of Cagayan is the provincial flag of Cagayan, Philippines. It is a horizontal triband of blue, gold and green, charged with the provincial coat-of-arms ringed by 29 white, five-pointed stars. It was adopted on March 11, 1970 by the virtue of Provincial Board Resolution No. 319.

Cagayan is one of the few Philippine provinces to have a distinctly-designed flag, deviating from the standard flag design of the provincial seal on a colored field. The flag has a proportion of 1:2, the same as the flag of the Philippines.

Symbolism
The colors of the flag has the following symbolisms:

Sky blue: signifies justice, honor, and nobility of the province's inhabitants, their sincerity and traditionally peaceful ways. Also represents the azure skies.
Gold: symbolizes the wealth of the province and represents the color of the bright sun.
Green: depicts the fertile soil of the province and also seeks to inspire hope among the people. It also represents the verdant mountains and plains of the province.

The 29 white, five-pointed stars ringing the coat-of-arms represent the 29 component city and municipalities comprising the province.

The coat-of-arms has the following symbolisms:
Yellow (or Gold) color: symbolizes the wealth of the province
Blue color: stands for justice, honor, nobility of the people, their sincerity and traditional peaceful ways;
Blue column dividing the shield: depicts the Cagayan River, which served as the border between the two original congressional districts of Cagayan;
Small islands at the top portion of the shield: represent the small islands on the northern part of the province;
Tobacco plants (left) and rice stalks (right): represent agriculture; rice and tobacco—along with corn and peanuts—are the province's main agricultural crops, and are major sources of income for its people.

Specifications

The length of the flag is twice its width, and the horizontal stripes are of equal size.

The coat-of-arms (shield) is drawn in black outline, and placed off-centered towards the hoist of the flag. The shield's height is approximately 1 and 1/4 the width of any of the stripes (or 5/12 of the flag width). The shield's width is calculated to be at 5/14 of the flag width (or 5/28 of the flag length), given that the specification for the width-to-height ratio of the shield is set at 6:7. 

The position of the shield in the flag is determined by first measuring two shield widths (5/7 of the flag width, or 5/14 of the flag length) from the edge of the fly, and then centering the shield in the remainder of the field.  The exact horizontal position of the center of the shield is therefore at the point measuring 9/28 of the flag length from the hoist. The shield abuts the blue stripe, straddles the gold stripe, and extends into the green stripe.

References

Cagayan
Cagayan, Flag of
Cagayan